Fiona Ruth Twycross, Baroness Twycross (born 29 May 1969) is a Labour Party politician. She was born in South London before moving to Oxford. She studied at Cheney School in Oxford before going on to study Scandinavian Studies at the University of Edinburgh and has a PhD in contemporary Scandinavian literature. She subsequently studied Public Policy and Management at Birkbeck, University of London. She has lived and worked in the East Midlands, Yorkshire and the Humber and the North East.

Career 
Prior her election as a member of the London Assembly, Twycross worked for Diabetes UK, as Head of Governance having previously worked as the charity's Head of Campaigns and Volunteer Development. She has also worked for the Labour Party as Regional Director in Yorkshire and the Humber and the North East, and was Agent for the Sedgefield by-election in which Phil Wilson MP replaced Tony Blair after his resignation from parliament.

Twycross was placed third on Labour's Assembly list for the 2012 London Assembly election and was elected as a Londonwide Assembly Member in May 2012. She was re-elected as a Londonwide member in 2016. Twycross most recently sat on the Assembly's Education Panel, and the Economy Committee. Twycross was a member of the London Fire and Emergency Planning Authority (LFEPA) from 2012 until its abolition in 2018. She served as Labour Group Leader on the Authority from July 2013, and as Chair from 2016 until LFEPA's 2018 abolition and her appointment as Sadiq Khan's Deputy Mayor for Fire and Resilience.

In February 2019, Twycross announced that she did not intend to seek re-election to the Assembly at the 2020 London Assembly election in order to concentrate on her Deputy Mayoral role. Following the extension of the Assembly's term to 2021 due to the COVID-19 pandemic, Twycross resigned as a member of the Assembly and was replaced by the next member on Labour's 2016 Londonwide list, former Assembly Member Murad Qureshi.

As well as the Labour Party, Twycross is also a member of the Co-operative Party, the Fabian Society and the Socialist Health Association.

It was announced on 14 October 2022, that as part of the 2022 Special Honours, Twycross would receive a life peerage. On 7 November 2022, she was created Baroness Twycross, of Headington in the City of Oxford.

Campaigns and activities 

Twycross has led a number of campaigns since being elected to the Assembly, notably leading a London Assembly investigation into the rise in food poverty in London which called for London to be a Zero Hunger City. Boris Johnson subsequently adopted the goal as part of his 2020 vision making London one of just two cities worldwide to sign up to the UN's Zero Hunger Challenge.

Twycross has led the Labour 999SOS campaign, fighting cuts to emergency services since its launch in October 2012.
In her former role as the London Assembly Labour Group's Economy spokesperson, Twycross challenged former Mayor of London Boris Johnson over low pay and poverty in London and over the use of zero hours contracts at City Hall.

In September 2013, Twycross co-founded the Labour Campaign for Universal Free School Meals with the GMB Union and Richard Watts, Leader of Islington Council.

In November 2018, London joined the 100 Resilient Cities project and Twycross was appointed to the role of City Hall's Chief Resilience Officer by Sadiq Khan.

References

1969 births
Living people
Labour Members of the London Assembly
Alumni of the University of Edinburgh
Alumni of Birkbeck, University of London
Women councillors in England
Labour Party (UK) life peers
Life peers created by Charles III
Life peeresses created by Charles III
21st-century British politicians
21st-century British women politicians